Tillman Ben Franks, Sr. (September 29, 1920 – October 26, 2006), was an American bassist and songwriter and the manager for a number of country music artists including Johnny Horton, David Houston, Webb Pierce, Claude King, and the Carlisles.

Background
Franks was born in Stamps in Lafayette County in southwestern Arkansas, to George Watson Franks (1890-1967) and the former Pearl Galloway (1896-1983). When he was two years of age, Franks' family relocated to Shreveport in northwestern Louisiana, where they assumed residence in the Cedar Grove neighborhood. In his later years he lived in southwestern Shreveport near his long-term friend Claude King, known for the 1962 hit songs "Wolverton Mountain" and "The Burning of Atlanta", a ballad about the 1864 battle of Atlanta in the American Civil War.

Franks served in the United States Army during World War II, after which he married the former Virginia Helen Suber (1927-2016), a native of Carthage, Texas, and a daughter of Earl Clark Suber (1900-1954), who served with the military police in World War II, and the former Rose Lee Rich (1907-1937). Virginia was subsequently reared in two Shreveport orphanages and like her husband graduated from C. E. Byrd High School in Shreveport. She became an artist with speciality in oil paintings, a seamstress, and sang with her husband of sixty years and their son, Tillman Franks, Jr. The Franks had two sons and two daughters.

Music career
After the war, Franks and Claude King formed the Rainbow Boys while working at an assortment of other jobs, mostly in automobile sales. On April 3, 1948, Franks played bass with the Bailes Brothers on the first night of the Louisiana Hayride, broadcast on Shreveport radio station KWKH.

In 1955, as Johnny Horton's manager, he switched the budding singer from Mercury Records to Columbia. He was the sole writer of Horton's first No. 1 single, 1959's "When It's Springtime in Alaska (It's Forty Below)". He and Horton were co-composers of "Honky Tonk Man", Horton's 1956 hit record, that Dwight Yoakam also recorded as his first single. During 1960, Franks co-wrote with Horton the successful singles "Sink the Bismark" and "North to Alaska". Franks was injured in the head and internally as well in the automobile accident on November 5, 1960, in Milano in Milam County in East Texas, which resulted in the death of Johnny Horton and the eventual loss of a leg by a third musician, Tommy Tomlinson.
 
Franks' contribution to rock and roll music has been recognized by his induction into the Rockabilly Hall of Fame, the Louisiana Hall of Fame, and his induction in 2003 into the Northwest Louisiana Walk of Stars where his feet and hand impressions are in concrete beside other talents, such as Elvis Presley, Terry Bradshaw, Kix Brooks, David Toms, and Franks' longtime friend Claude King. The "Walk of Stars" is located under the Shreveport side of Texas Street Bridge, officially known as the Long–Allen Bridge (Shreveport) that spans the Red River to Bossier City.

Tillman Franks helped to coin the phrase "The Magic Circle," which he describes in his autobiography as:  "an area 50-miles in radius from downtown Shreveport from which many kinds of music evolved. I was lucky to have lived my life in The Magic Circle."

Legacy
On July 11, 1996, Shreveport observed "Tillman Franks Day", sponsored by KWKH.

Franks died in the fall of 2006 at the age of eighty-six. His son, the Reverend Watson Franks, preached the funeral. The family is interred at Forest Park West Cemetery in Shreveport.

In 2019, KEEL Radio recalled Franks as "a legend that should be remembered [for] all the contributions not only to Shreveport's musical history but to rock and country."

Franks' out-of-print autobiography entitled Tillman Franks: I  Was There When It Happened is still in demand by his remaining fans.

Notes

External links
Tillman Franks Web site
[ Franks at Allmusic.com]
Frank Tillman at Hillbilly-Music.com

1920 births
2006 deaths
American double-bassists
Male double-bassists
American country songwriters
American male songwriters
American talent agents
People from Stamps, Arkansas
Writers from Shreveport, Louisiana
C. E. Byrd High School alumni
Musicians from Shreveport, Louisiana
Starday Records artists
United States Army personnel of World War II
United States Army soldiers
20th-century American musicians
Songwriters from Louisiana
Songwriters from Arkansas
20th-century double-bassists
20th-century American male musicians